Lajenu (also Romanized as Lajenū) is a village in Borun Rural District, in the Eslamiyeh District of Ferdows County, South Khorasan Province, Iran. At the 2006 census, its population was 42, in 11 families.

References 

Populated places in Ferdows County